Thompson Unachi Ekpe (born 14 December 1996) is a Nigerian footballer who plays for Al Nassirya.

Career

Club

Molde FK
On 23 March 2016 Ekpe joined Molde FK on a three-year contract.

On 26 July 2016, Ekpe joined Kristiansund BK on loan for the rest of the 2016 season. Ekpe returned to Kristiansund on 9 March 2017 on loan until 31 July 2017.

Arendal
On 19 July 2017, Ekpe moved to Arendal on a permanent transfer. Ekpe left the club at the end of the 2018 season.

Career statistics

Club

References

External links

Thompson Ekpe at NFF

1996 births
Living people
Nigerian footballers
Nigerian expatriate sportspeople in Norway
Nigerian expatriate footballers
Expatriate footballers in Norway
Molde FK players
Kristiansund BK players
Eliteserien players
Norwegian First Division players
Arendal Fotball players
Association football midfielders